The Belarus national under-19 football team is the national under-19 football team of Belarus and is controlled by the Football Federation of Belarus. The team competed in the UEFA European Under-19 Football Championship, held every year.

History
Belarus managed to qualify for the final phase of European Under-19 Championship just once, in their inaugural season (1994). They were eliminated in the group stage.

European Championship record

Under-18 era

Under-19 era

UEFA U-19 Euro 2014 qualification

Qualifying round

See also 
 Belarus national football team
 Belarus national under-23 football team
 Belarus national under-21 football team
 Belarus national under-17 football team

References

Under-19
European national under-19 association football teams